Hamse Mohamed Abdi is a Somali politician, who is currently serving as the Governor of Togdheer region of Somaliland since January 2018.

See also

 Governor of Togdheer
 Togdheer Region

References

Living people
Governors of Togdheer
Year of birth missing (living people)